Ignatius Taschner (9 April 1871 – 25 November 1913), also known as Ignaz Taschner, was a German sculptor, medalist, graphic designer and illustrator.

Life 
Ignatius Taschner was born in 1871, he was the son of Bartholomew Taschner, a stonemason originating from Straubing. He spent his childhood and youth in Lohr am Main. From 1885 to 1888 he completed an apprenticeship as a stonemason in Schweinfurt with the sculptor Wilhelm Kämpf and worked there for a year as a journeyman. He then studied from 1889 to 1895 at the Munich Academy of Fine Arts under Syrius Eberle and Jakob Bradl. Among his fellow students were the sculptor Georg Wrba and Josef Rauch. On 27 April 1899, he married Helene Felber.

Work 
In 1894, he received his first contract from the city of Schweinfurt to work on a war memorial. Around the turn of the century Taschner had been making a substantial impression on the artists of the Munich, Vienna and Berlin Secessions. Taschner's early period ended in 1897 with an order from Karl von Marr for a tomb for the Berlin painter Carl Bennewitz von Loefen. Then in 1898, working for the architects Helbig & Haiger, he made a series of decorative murals in the Munich Kunstgewerbehaus as well as for an exhibition in the Glasspalast. He received his first orders for graphics from the Viennese publisher Martin Gerlach.  He drew invitations and postcards for the carnival party ″Schwabinger Bauernkirchweih″ of the Association of Art students in Munich in 1898 (and for all other ″Schwabinger Bauernkirchweih″ parties until 1905). He also created the characters ″Strauchdieb″ and ″Hl. Cäcilia″.

In 1900 he participated in the competition for a Kaiser-Friedrich monument in Oels (Oleśnica) and a Goethe Memorial in Strasbourg (3rd prize), created the group ″Rauhbein″, the illustrations for ″Grimm's Fairy Tales″ for Publisher Martin Gerlach and participated at the Paris World Exhibition with the figures ″Hl. Martin″ and ″Strauchdieb″. In 1902 he participated in a fountain competition for Kempten (2nd prize), designed a silver crucifix, created the figure ″Unterfranken″ for the New Town Hall in Munich, the etchings ″Kirchgang und Botenfuhrwerk″ and the illustrations for ″Die Nymphe des Brunnens″ and ″Kirchgang″ for the publisher Martin Gerlach.

Lecturer in Breslau 
In 1903 Taschner became a lecturer at the Royal Arts and Crafts School in Breslau. He became friends with Ludwig Thoma of Munich, then editor of Simplicissimus; for whose story Der heilige Hies he contributed the illustrations. An essential part of his jewelry works was created also at this time in connection with the metal class of the Breslau School of Art.

Berlin – Architectural sculptures 
In 1904 Taschner went to Berlin and worked for the famous architect Alfred Messel and especially for Ludwig Hoffmann, for whom he produced many architectural sculptures. He designed the silverware of Crown Prince Wilhelm as well as other industrial designs. Ignatius Taschner was an early member of the Deutscher Künstlerbund. In its third annual exhibition 1906 in Weimar Taschner showed the first version of the Parsival-equestrian statuette.

Mitterndorf near Dachau 
In 1906 Taschner moved to Mitterndorf near Dachau, where he built a villa like other famous artists on a large piece of land. Soon afterwards the designs for the ten figures of the Märchenbrunnen in the Volkspark Friedrichshain in Berlin were completed.  In 1911 the interior of his villa in Mitterndorf - designed by Taschner himself - was completed. Only a few years he could live together with his wife and his two little girls in his villa. He was ill and overworked and his heart stopped suddenly.

Death 
Taschner died suddenly on 25 November 1913 in Mitterndorf near Dachau.

Most important works 
 1895: war memorial in the town cemetery in Schweinfurt
 1896–1904: architectural sculpture for the Wertheim department store on Leipziger Platz in Berlin-Mitte (architect Alfred Messel)
 1901/1902: Parsifal zu Pferde, Bronze-Kleinplastik, 37 x 18 x 38 cm. Staatliche Museen zu Berlin – Preußischer Kulturbesitz, Nationalgalerie
 1904: Illustrations for Ludwig Thomas story Der heilige Hies 
 1904–1911: Participation in the architectural sculpture for the Stadthaus in Berlin-Mitte
 1904–1914: Crown silver
 1908: Four reliefs an der 
 1910: Fischerbuberl-Brunnen on the Wiener Platz in München
 1911–1912: Statuettes for Märchenbrunnen in Berlin-Friedrichshain
 1904: Illustrations for the Brothers Grimms fairy tales
 Illustrations for Johann Karl August Musäus' Die Nymphe des Brunnens

Influence and honors 
 After his death, Ludwig Thoma and the art critic Heilmeyer put out a commemorative volume, which appeared 1921.
 In Bad Kissingen and Lohr am Main there is a road named after him "Ignatius-Taschner-Straße".
 In Dachau, there is the Ignaz-Taschner-Gymnasium.
 In Mitterdorf near Dachau there is also an "Ignatius-Taschner-Straße".

Literature 
 Norbert Götz, Ursel Berger (Hrsg.): Ignatius Taschner. Ein Künstlerleben zwischen Jugendstil und Neoklassizismus. (Katalog anlässlich der gleichnamigen Ausstellung im Münchner Stadtmuseum 1992) München, Klinckhardt und Biermann 1992. 
 Ursula Sautmann: Hommage an Taschner. Porträt Ignatz Fischer-Kerli und der Jugendstilkünstler. In: Süddeutsche Zeitung, Lokalausgabe Fürstenfeldbruck, 24 May 2008.
 Taschner, Ignatius in: Thieme-Becker: Allgemeines Lexikon der Bildenden Künstler von der Antike bis zur Gegenwart. Bd. 40 (Ta-Tie) zusammen mit Hans Vollmer (Hrsg.): Allgemeines Lexikon der bildenden Künstler des XX. Jahrhunderts. E. A. Seemann (CD-ROM), Leipzig 2008.  (S. 60)

References

External links 

 
  Deutsche Gesellschaft für Medaillenkunst e.V. – 419

1871 births
1913 deaths
German sculptors
German male sculptors
German illustrators
German graphic designers
Academy of Fine Arts, Munich alumni